Mannukketha Ponnu  is a 1985 Indian Tamil-language film, directed by Ramarajan and produced by P. S. V Hariharan. The film stars Pandiyan and Ilavarasi, with Goundamani, Senthil, Vinu Chakravarthy, Ganthimathi and Kovai Sarala in supporting roles.

Cast 
 Pandiyan as Marudhan
 Ilavarasi as Bhaggiyam
 Goundamani as Vishamurukki Veluchami
 Senthil as Ammavasai
 Vinu Chakravarthy as Bhaggiyam's father
 Ganthimathi as  Bhaggiyam's mother
 Chandrasekhar
 Kovai Sarala as Thenmozhi
 Pasi Sathya as Villager
 K. K. Soundar as Villager
 Pasi Narayanan as Villager
 T. K. S. Natarajan as Patient of Veluchami
 Vellai Subbaiah as Patient of Veluchami
 Idichapuli Selvaraj as Station Master

Guest Appearances

 Nizhalgal Ravi
 Nalini

Soundtrack 
The Songs were written by Pulamaipithan, Vairamuthu, Muthulingam, Gangai Amaran. Music was composed by Gangai Amaran.

Reception
Jayamanmadhan of Kalki wrote the plot reminded of films like Kizhakke Pogum Rail and Puthiya Vaarpugal and felt Pandiyan and Ilavarasi were there because the film needed a hero and heroine. The critic however praised Gangai Amaran's music, Goundamani's comedy and acting of Chandrasekar and concluded there is youthfulness and songs with humming but the others are plain old.

References

External links 

1985 films
1980s Tamil-language films
Films scored by Gangai Amaran
Films directed by Ramarajan